Cynips quercusechinus, the urchin gall wasp, is a species of gall wasp in the family Cynipidae. It induces its galls, which resemble sea urchins, on the leaves of oak trees. These galls are about 10mm in diameter. The galls fall with the leaves in autumn, and the larvae inside of them emerge as adults in the spring.

This species was first described by Carl Robert Osten-Sacken in 1870 based on specimens from California.

References 

Cynipidae
Gall-inducing insects
Fauna of the San Francisco Bay Area
Insects described in 1870
Taxa named by Carl Robert Osten-Sacken
Hymenoptera of North America